Bandank (also Romanized as Bandānḵ; also known as Sīḵūri-ye Soflá) is a village in Shusef Rural District, Shusef District, Nehbandan County, South Khorasan Province, Iran. At the 2006 census, its population was 92, in 20 families.

References 

Populated places in Nehbandan County